Jack Curtis, Jr. (June 16, 1926 – September 1970) was an American voice actor, director, producer, writer and editor. He began his career as an actor in radio shows in the 1940s. He directed, produced, shot and edited the sci-fi thriller film The Flesh Eaters (1964). He did numerous voice-overs. His voice was featured in several cartoons, and he dubbed the voices for animated characters that included Kimba the White Lion, Marine Boy, and Speed Racer for the Japanese anime series in 1967.

Early life
He was born in Queens, New York, the son of theatrical agent Jack Curtis and vaudeville dancer Mabel Ford. His half sister was actress Beatrice Curtis (1901-1963), whose first husband was the vaudevillian actor Harry Fox of the dance the foxtrot. He was also the first cousin of magician Roy Benson who appeared on The Ed Sullivan Show.

Career
Curtis started acting as a teenager in the early 1940, performing in various radio shows, including Coast to Coast on a Bus, where he first met Peter Fernandez. Curtis never did on camera work because he was born with a defect to his hand, which had been wrapped up in the umbilical cord and never properly formed. He did play the piano, however.

In 1962, he made the cult classic The Flesh Eaters, which was released in 1964. Besides being credited as the film's director, he also wrote, edited, and provided camera work.

On December 31, 1964, he and actress Paulette Rubinstein were married. They had one child, Liane Curtis (born July 11, 1965), who became an actress.

Curtis was hired to dub voices for the anime series Speed Racer by his longtime friend Peter Fernandez. At the time he also provided voice-overs for the cartoon series Marine Boy. He had a company that was named Film Sync, and did a lot of dubbing work.

Death
In September 1970, at the age of 44, Curtis died of pneumonia that he contracted in the hospital, which could not be treated as he was allergic to penicillin, the only antidote in 1970. He was remembered fondly by friends and co-workers alike, particularly for his sense of humor and practical jokes. Corinne Orr recalled, "He was so outrageous, and a warm and giving person."

Filmography

Film
Killer's Kiss (1955) - TV Announcer (Uncredited)
Prince of Space (1959) - Additional voices
The Flesh Eaters (1964) - Radio Deejay
Mothra vs. Godzilla (1964) - Torahata
Planet of the Vampires (1965) - Capt. Sallas
Gammera the Invincible (1966) - News Announcer, Police Officer
Speed Racer: The Movie (1967) - Pops Racer
Marine Boy (1968) - Bulton

Television
Speed Racer (1967–1968) - Pops Racer, Inspector Detector, assorted villains

Production work
Juventud a la intemperie (1961) (As editor)
The Flesh Eaters (1964) (As director, producer, writer and editor)
The Sexperts: Touched by Temptation (1965) (As editor)
We Are All Naked (1966) (As writer)
Placer sangriento (1967) (As writer)

References

External links
Jack Curtis at the Internet Movie Database

1926 births
1970 deaths
20th-century American male actors
American male voice actors
Male actors from New York City
Deaths from pneumonia in the United States